The Minister of Production was a British government position that existed during the Second World War, heading the Ministry of Production.

Initially the post was called "Minister of War Production" when it was created in February 1942, but the first Minister, Lord Beaverbrook, resigned after only two weeks in office. A month later upon the appointment of the second holder the post was titled "Minister of Production".

Minister of War Production (1942)

Minister of Production (1942-1945)

Production
Defunct ministerial offices in the United Kingdom